The men's 20 kilometres walk event at the 2019 Summer Universiade was held on 12 July in Naples.

Results

Individual

Team

References

20
2019